Poecilia vetiprovidentiae is a species of fish in the family Poeciliidae that is endemic to Colombia.

References

vetiprovidentiae
Freshwater fish of Colombia
Endemic fauna of Colombia
Fish described in 1950
Taxonomy articles created by Polbot